Michael Russell was the defending champion, but chose to compete in Belgrade instead.
Kei Nishikori won in the final 6–4, 6–0, against Ryan Sweeting.

Seeds

Draw

Finals

Top half

Bottom half

References
Main draw
Qualifying singles

2010 ATP Challenger Tour
2010 Singles